The 46th New York State Legislature, consisting of the New York State Senate and the New York State Assembly, met from January 7 to April 24, 1823, during the first year of Joseph C. Yates's governorship, in Albany.

Background
A Constitutional Convention met from August 28 to November 10, 1821, and the new Constitution was adopted by the voters in January 1822. Under the provisions of the New York Constitution of 1821, 32 Senators were elected on general tickets in eight senatorial districts for four-year terms. They were divided into four classes, and every year eight Senate seats came up for election. Assemblymen were elected countywide on general tickets to a one-year term, the whole Assembly being renewed annually.

The new Constitution legislated Gov. DeWitt Clinton and Lt. Gov. John Tayler out of office at the end of 1822. Besides, the Council of Appointment was abolished, and the State officers were to be elected by the State Legislature.

On April 12, 1822, the Legislature re-apportioned the Assembly districts. All previously existing multiple-county districts (except Hamilton and Montgomery) were dismembered, and every county became a district. The total number of assemblymen was increased from 126 to 128.

On April 17, 1822, the Legislature enacted that future State elections be held on the first Monday in November and the two succeeding days.

At this time New York politics were dominated by the Bucktails faction of the Democratic-Republican Party. The opposing Democratic-Republican faction, the "Clintonians" disappeared after DeWitt Clinton decided not to run in the New York gubernatorial election, 1822; and the Federalist Party had virtually disbanded. Nevertheless, in some districts Clintonian or Federalist Senate and Assembly tickets were put up in opposition to the Bucktails (which were considered the "regular" Democratic-Republican nominees), but without much success.

The Bucktails nominated Supreme Court Justice Joseph C. Yates for Governor, and Erastus Root for Lieutenant Governor. The Clintonians made no nomination for Governor, but nominated Henry Huntington for Lieutenant Governor. Solomon Southwick nominated himself for Governor.

Elections
The State election was held from November 4 to 6, 1822. Joseph C. Yates and Erastus Root were elected. All 32 State senators were elected on the regular Democratic-Republican tickets.

Sessions
The Legislature met at the Old State Capitol in Albany on January 7, 1823, and adjourned on April 24.

Peter R. Livingston (Buckt.) was elected Speaker with 117 votes out of 123.

On January 27, the Senate rejected the re-appointment of Chief Justice Ambrose Spencer and Associate Supreme Court Justices Jonas Platt and John Woodworth; and confirmed the appointment of Nathan Sanford as Chancellor to succeed James Kent.

On January 28, Gov. Yates nominated State Comptroller John Savage as Chief Justice; and Jacob Sutherland and Samuel Betts as associate justices.

On January 29, Savage and Sutherland were confirmed, but the appointment of Betts was rejected. Thereupon Gov. Yates re-nominated Woodworth who was confirmed after some debate by a slim margin.

On February 13, the Legislature elected Secretary of State John Van Ness Yates, Attorney General Samuel A. Talcott and Surveyor General Simeon De Witt to succeed themselves; and William L. Marcy to succeed Savage as State Comptroller.

On March 31, the Legislature appointed Edwin Croswell and Isaac Q. Leake as State Printers.

On April 17, the Legislature enacted that there shall be eight New York State Circuit Courts, one in each senatorial district. Gov. Yates nominated as judges: Ogden Edwards (1st D.); Samuel Betts (2nd D.); William A. Duer (3rd D.); Reuben H. Walworth (4th D.); Nathan Williams (5th D.); Samuel Nelson (6th D.); Enos T. Throop (7th D.) and William B. Rochester (8th D.). They were confirmed on April 21.

State Senate

Districts
The First District (4 seats) consisted of Kings, New York, Queens, Richmond and Suffolk counties.
The Second District (4 seats) consisted of Dutchess, Orange, Putnam, Rockland, Sullivan, Ulster and Westchester counties.
The Third District (4 seats) consisted of Albany, Columbia, Greene, Rensselaer, Schenectady and Schoharie counties.
The Fourth District (4 seats) consisted of Clinton, Essex, Franklin, Hamilton, Montgomery, St. Lawrence, Saratoga, Warren and Washington counties.
The Fifth District (4 seats) consisted of Herkimer, Jefferson, Lewis, Madison, Oneida and Oswego counties.
The Sixth District (4 seats) consisted of Broome, Chenango, Cortland, Delaware, Otsego, Tioga and Tompkins counties.
The Seventh District (4 seats) consisted of Cayuga, Onondaga, Ontario and Seneca counties.
The Eighth District (4 seats) consisted of Allegany, Cattaraugus, Chautauqua, Erie, Genesee, Livingston, Monroe, Niagara and Steuben counties.

Note: There are now 62 counties in the State of New York. The counties which are not mentioned in this list had not yet been established, or sufficiently organized, the area being included in one or more of the abovementioned counties.

Members
The asterisk (*) denotes members of the previous Legislature who continued in office as members of this Legislature. James Burt and Byram Green changed from the Assembly to the Senate.

Under the provisions of the new Constitution, upon taking office the senators were classified by drawing lots to terms of one, two, three or four years, as shown in the table below.

Employees
Clerk: John F. Bacon

State Assembly

Districts

Albany County (3 seats)
Allegany County (1 seat)
Broome County (1 seat)
Cattaraugus County (1 seat)
Cayuga County (4 seats)
Chautauqua County (1 seat)
Chenango County (3 seats)
Clinton County (1 seat)
Columbia County (3 seats)
Cortland County (2 seats)
Delaware County (2 seats)
Dutchess County (4 seats)
Erie County (1 seat)
Essex County (1 seat)
Franklin County (1 seat)
Genesee County (4 seats)
Greene County (2 seats)
Hamilton and Montgomery co. (4 seats)
Herkimer County (3 seats)
Jefferson County (3 seats)
Kings County (1 seat)
Lewis County (1 seat)
Livingston County (2 seats)
Madison County (3 seats)
Monroe County (3 seats)
The City and County of New York (10 seats)
Niagara County (1 seat)
Oneida County (5 seats)
Onondaga County (4 seats)
Ontario County (6 seats)
Orange County (4 seats)
Oswego County (1 seat)
Otsego County (4 seats)
Putnam County (1 seat)
Queens County (2 seats)
Rensselaer County (4 seats)
Richmond County (1 seat)
Rockland County (1 seat)
St. Lawrence County (1 seat)
Saratoga County (3 seats)
Schenectady County (1 seat)
Schoharie County (2 seats)
Seneca County (2 seats)
Steuben County (2 seats)
Suffolk County (2 seats)
Sullivan County (1 seat)
Tioga County (2 seats)
Tompkins County (2 seats)
Ulster County (3 seats)
Warren County (1 seat)
Washington (4 seats)
Westchester County (3 seats)

Note: There are now 62 counties in the State of New York. The counties which are not mentioned in this list had not yet been established, or sufficiently organized, the area being included in one or more of the abovementioned counties.

Assemblymen
The asterisk (*) denotes members of the previous Legislature who continued as members of this Legislature. Peter R. Livingston changed from the Senate to the Assembly.

Employees
Clerk: Edward Livingston
Sergeant-at-Arms: Henry Fryer
Doorkeeper: James Myers
Assistant Doorkeeper: Richard Ten Broeck

Notes

Sources
The New York Civil List compiled by Franklin Benjamin Hough (Weed, Parsons and Co., 1858) [see pg. 109 for Senate districts; pg. 125 for senators; pg. 148f for Assembly districts; pg. 199f for assemblymen]
The History of Political Parties in the State of New-York, from the Ratification of the Federal Constitution to 1840 by Jabez D. Hammond (4th ed., Vol. 2, Phinney & Co., Buffalo, 1850; pg. 98 to 124)
Election result Assembly, Clinton Co. at project "A New Nation Votes", compiled by Phil Lampi, hosted by Tufts University Digital Library
Election result Assembly, Delaware Co. at project "A New Nation Votes"
Election result Assembly, Greene Co. at project "A New Nation Votes"
Election result Assembly, Kings Co. at project "A New Nation Votes"
Election result Assembly, Monroe Co. at project "A New Nation Votes"
Election result Assembly, Niagara Co. at project "A New Nation Votes"
Election result Assembly, Richmond Co. at project "A New Nation Votes"
Election result Assembly, Seneca Co. at project "A New Nation Votes"
Election result Assembly, Suffolk Co. at project "A New Nation Votes"
Election result Assembly, Tioga Co. at project "A New Nation Votes"
Election result Assembly, Ulster Co. at project "A New Nation Votes"
Partial election result Senate, First D. at project "A New Nation Votes" [gives only votes of Kings, Richmond and Suffolk Co.]
Partial election result Senate, Second D. at project "A New Nation Votes" [gives only votes of Ulster Co.]
Partial election result Senate, Third D. at project "A New Nation Votes" [gives only votes of Greene Co.]
Partial election result Senate, Fourth D. at project "A New Nation Votes" [gives only votes from Clinton Co.]
Partial election result Senate, Sixth D. at project "A New Nation Votes" [gives only votes of Tioga Co.]
Partial election result Senate, Seventh D. at project "A New Nation Votes" [gives only votes of Seneca Co.]
Partial election result Senate, Eighth D. at project "A New Nation Votes" [gives only votes from Monroe and Niagara Co.]

046
1823 in New York (state)
1823 U.S. legislative sessions